Charles Pape was a Belgian fencer. He competed in the individual and team foil events at the 1920 Summer Olympics.

References

Year of birth missing
Year of death missing
Belgian male fencers
Belgian foil fencers
Olympic fencers of Belgium
Fencers at the 1920 Summer Olympics